Caloptilia anthobaphes is a moth of the family Gracillariidae. It is known from Canada (Nova Scotia, Ontario, Québec) and the United States (Michigan and Vermont).

The larvae feed on Vaccinium species, including Vaccinium ovatum. They mine the leaves of their host plant.

References

anthobaphes
Moths of North America
Moths described in 1921